Almalu (also Romanized as Ālmālū) is a village in Sahandabad Rural District, Tekmeh Dash District, Bostanabad County, East Azerbaijan Province, Iran. At the 2006 census, its population was 305, in 64 families.

References 

Populated places in Bostanabad County